In mathematics, a confluent hypergeometric function is a solution of a confluent hypergeometric equation, which is a degenerate form of a hypergeometric differential equation where two of the three regular singularities merge into an irregular singularity. The term confluent refers to the merging of singular points of families of differential equations; confluere is Latin for "to flow together". There are several common standard forms of confluent hypergeometric functions:

This is also known as the confluent hypergeometric function of the first kind. There is a different and unrelated Kummer's function bearing the same name.
This is also known as the confluent hypergeometric function of the second kind.
 Whittaker functions (for Edmund Taylor Whittaker) are  solutions to Whittaker's equation.
 Coulomb wave functions are solutions to the Coulomb wave equation.

The Kummer functions,  Whittaker functions, and Coulomb wave functions are essentially the same, and differ from each other only by elementary functions and change of variables.

Kummer's equation
Kummer's equation may be written as:

where:

 
 

is the rising factorial.

See #Special cases. When  is a non-positive integer, then Kummer's function (if it is defined) is a generalized Laguerre polynomial.

Just as the confluent differential equation is a limit of the hypergeometric differential equation as the singular point at 1 is moved towards the singular point at ∞, the confluent hypergeometric function can be given as a limit of the hypergeometric function

and many of the properties of the confluent hypergeometric function are limiting cases of properties of the hypergeometric function.

Since Kummer's equation is second order there must be another, independent, solution. If we let  be

then the differential equation gives

which, upon dividing out  and simplifying, becomes

It is a combination of the above two solutions, defined by

Although this expression is undefined for integer , it has the advantage that it can be extended to any integer  by continuity. But see #Special cases for some examples where it is an entire function (polynomial).

Note that the solution  to Kummer's equation is the same as the solution , see #Kummer's transformation.

In that case as well,  can be used as a second solution if it exists and is different.

When a = 0 we can alternatively use:

When  this is the exponential integral .

Other equations
Confluent Hypergeometric Functions can be used to solve the Extended Confluent Hypergeometric Equation whose general form is given as:
 

Consider the equation:

Next we use the substitution:

and multiply the equation by the same factor, obtaining:

whose solution is

where  is a solution to Kummer's equation with

Note that the square root may give an imaginary or complex number. If it is zero, another solution must be used, namely

where  is a confluent hypergeometric limit function satisfying

As noted below, even the Bessel equation can be solved using confluent hypergeometric functions.

Integral representations
If ,  can be represented as an integral

thus  is the characteristic function of the beta distribution. For  with positive real part  can be obtained by the Laplace integral

The integral defines a solution in the right half-plane .

They can also be represented as Barnes integrals

Asymptotic behavior
This is in fact the case for Tricomi's solution . Its asymptotic behavior as  can be deduced from the integral representations. If , then making a change of variables in the integral followed by expanding the binomial series and integrating it formally term by term gives rise to an asymptotic series expansion, valid as :

This asymptotic expansion is also valid for complex  instead of real , with 

The asymptotic behavior of Kummer's solution for large  is:

The first term is not needed when  is finite, that is when  is not a non-positive integer and the real part of  goes to negative infinity, whereas the second term is not needed when  is finite, that is, when  is a not a non-positive integer and the real part of  goes to positive infinity.

Relations
There are many relations between Kummer functions for various arguments and their derivatives. This section gives a few typical examples.

Contiguous relations
This gives  relations, given by identifying any two lines on the right hand side of

In the notation above, and so on.

Repeatedly applying these relations gives a linear relation between any three functions of the form  (and their higher derivatives), where ,  are integers.

Kummer's transformation
Kummer's functions are also related by Kummer's transformations:

.

Multiplication theorem
The following multiplication theorems hold true:

Connection with Laguerre polynomials and similar representations
In terms of Laguerre polynomials, Kummer's functions have several expansions, for example

 
or

Special cases
Functions that can be expressed as special cases of the confluent hypergeometric function include:
Some elementary functions where the left-hand side is not defined when  is a non-positive integer, but the right-hand side is still a solution of the corresponding Kummer equation:

 (a polynomial if  is a non-positive integer)

 for non-positive integer  is a generalized Laguerre polynomial.
 for non-positive integer  is a multiple of a generalized Laguerre polynomial, equal to  when the latter exists.

 for non-negative integer  is a Bessel polynomial (see lower down).
 etc.
Using the contiguous relation  we get, for example, 
Bateman's function
Bessel functions and many related functions such as Airy functions, Kelvin functions, Hankel functions. For example, in the special case  the function reduces to a Bessel function:

This identity is sometimes also referred to as Kummer's second transformation. Similarly

When  is a non-positive integer, this equals  where  is a Bessel polynomial.
 The error function can be expressed as

Coulomb wave function
Cunningham functions
Exponential integral and related functions such as the sine integral, logarithmic integral
Hermite polynomials
Incomplete gamma function
Laguerre polynomials
Parabolic cylinder function (or Weber function)
Poisson–Charlier function
Toronto functions

 The general -th raw moment ( not necessarily an integer) can be expressed as
  

Application to continued fractions

By applying a limiting argument to Gauss's continued fraction it can be shown that

Notes

References

External links
 Confluent Hypergeometric Functions in NIST Digital Library of Mathematical Functions
 Kummer hypergeometric function on the Wolfram Functions site
 Tricomi hypergeometric function on the  Wolfram Functions site

Hypergeometric functions
Special hypergeometric functions
Special functions